Malice is a total conversion for Quake, developed jointly by Team Epochalypse (which would go on to form Ratloop) and Quantum Axcess, and published by Quantum Axcess in November 1997 as a commercial game. It would later be bundled with both the original Quake and the Q!Zone add-on in the form of the Resurrection Pack for Quake compilation, distributed by GT Interactive in 1998. Malice, not being a stand-alone total conversion, requires the full version of Quake in order to be played.

Plot 
Set in the 23rd century in the year 2230, the player assumes the role of a bandana wearing mercenary named Damage. Working for Colonel Bossman and his underground crime syndicate, B.O.S.S., the player is pitted against Bossman's main rival, Takahiro Industries. Takahiro Industries has its own security, too, with an army of guards as well as various sophisticated robots. It is these that Damage has to fight against, going through various futuristic environments in order to assassinate Takahiro himself.

Gameplay 
Being a total conversion of Quake, Malice features a similar gameplay style to that title. The game includes eighteen new levels, fourteen new enemies, various additional items (known as "Toyz" in the game), a new soundtrack, and new weapons. Unlike in Quake, weapons in Malice can be manually reloaded.

Reception 

Press reactions to Malice were generally high in praise, with the game earning positive reviews from all publications featured. Online publication Adrenaline Vault gave the game 4.5/5 and it won their "Best Addon Award" in 1997. PC Gamer UK gave the game their "Game of Distinction Award" in 1997. PC Zone also praised the game, noting favourably how well Malice managed to get away from the original Quake and awarded the game 80%.

References

External links 
 Ratloop: Malice
 
 Malice: 23rd Century Ultraconversion for Quake at MobyGames

1997 video games
First-person shooters
Quake mods
DOS games
Windows games
Linux games
Classic Mac OS games
Id Tech games
Science fiction video games
Video games developed in the United States
Video games set in the 23rd century
Multiplayer and single-player video games